Konrad Wilczynski (born 9 February 1982) is an Austrian handball player for SG Handball West Wien and the Austrian national team.

References

1982 births
Living people
Austrian male handball players